A kinetic triangulation data structure is a kinetic data structure that maintains a triangulation of a set of moving points. Maintaining a kinetic triangulation is important for applications that involve motion planning, such as video games, virtual reality, dynamic simulations and robotics.

Choosing a triangulation scheme
The efficiency of a kinetic data structure is defined based on the ratio of the number of internal events to external events, thus good runtime bounds can sometimes be obtained by choosing to use a triangulation scheme that generates a small number of external events.
Finding any triangulation scheme that has a near-quadratic bound on the number of discrete changes is an important open problem.

Delaunay triangulation

Other triangulations

Pseudo-triangulations
There is a kinetic data structure (due to Agarwal et al.) which maintains a pseudo-triangulation in  events total. All events are external and require  time to process.

References

Kinetic data structures
Triangulation (geometry)